This is a list of best-selling albums in the United States of the Nielsen SoundScan era. SoundScan began tracking sales data for Billboard on March 1, 1991. SoundScan data is unrelated to the Recording Industry Association of America (RIAA) certifications, and is based on actual sales while
the RIAA's certification process is based on shipments.

Best-sellers (overall)

Best-selling albums by decade

1991–1999

2000–2009

2010–2019

Best-selling albums by year

The following list includes the annual best-selling albums since 1991, as reported by MRC Data (formerly Nielsen SoundScan). For albums released after 2015, the best-performing album of the year is determined by album-equivalent units consisted of album sales, digital songs sales, and on-demand streaming, while the best-selling album is determined by album sales only.

Single week best-sellers

The first album in the SoundScan era to sell a million copies or more in a week is the soundtrack of The Bodyguard by Whitney Houston in 1992; the most recent album to do so is Midnights by Taylor Swift in 2022. The following is a list of all of the albums that sold at least one million copies in a single week:

See also

 Album era
List of best-selling albums in the United States
List of best-selling albums by year in the United States

References
Footnotes

Notes

United States, Nielsen SoundScan tracking